"Hands Across the Sea" is a song by English new wave band Modern English. It was released as the second single from the band's third album Ricochet Days, and was produced by Hugh Jones. It reached No. 91 on the Billboard Hot 100 and No. 43 on the Billboard Rock chart.

References

1984 songs
1984 singles
Modern English (band) songs
4AD singles
Song recordings produced by Hugh Jones (producer)